Maramie is a locality in the Shire of Carpentaria, Queensland, Australia.

History 
The locality takes its name from Maramie Creek (now called Clark Creek) which was in turn named by pastoralists Francis Lascelles Jardine and Alexander William Jardine after the fresh water crayfish (known to them as maramie) which they caught in the creek.

Geography
The Mitchell River flows through from east to north-west. The Alice River rises in the locality and flows north-west to its junction with the Mitchell on the north-western boundary.

Road infrastructure
The Burke Developmental Road (State Route 27) runs through from east to south.

Education 
There are no schools in Maramie. The nearest primary school is in Kowanyama (P-6). There are no secondary schools nearby.

References 

Shire of Carpentaria
Localities in Queensland